Ellis Bevan (born 10 March 2000) is a Welsh rugby union player, currently playing for Pro14 side Cardiff Rugby. His preferred position is scrum-half.

Cardiff Rugby
Bevan signed for Cardiff during the 2020–21 season from Cardiff Metropolitan University. He made his Cardiff debut in Round 1 of the Pro14 Rainbow Cup against , scoring a try.

References

External links
itsrugby.co.uk Profile

2000 births
Living people
Cardiff Rugby players
English people of Welsh descent
English rugby union players
Rugby union players from Solihull
Rugby union scrum-halves
Welsh rugby union players